Smoleń or Smolen may refer to:

Places
 Smoleń, Silesian Voivodeship (south Poland)
 Smoleń, Warmian-Masurian Voivodeship (north Poland)
 Smoleń, West Pomeranian Voivodeship (north-west Poland)

People 

 Bohdan Smoleń (1947–2016), Polish comedian, singer, actor
 Michal Smolen (Smoleń, bron 1993), Polish-American slalom canoeist
 Mike Smolen (1940–1992), American bridge player
 Molly Smolen, American ballet dancer
 Stanisław Smoleń (born 1952), Polish diplomat
 Tomasz Smoleń (born 1983), Polish racing cyclist
 Vivian Smolen (1916–2006), American actress

Other uses
 Smolen (surname)
 Smolen Bridge, a covered bridge in Ohio
 Smolen convention, a bidding convention in contract bridge adjunct to Stayman convention

See also
 
__notoc__